Sharypovo Airport  is an airport in Krasnoyarsk Krai, Russia located 9 km south of Sharypovo, Krasnoyarsk Krai. It services small transport planes.

References
RussianAirFields.com

Airports built in the Soviet Union
Airports in Krasnoyarsk Krai